Baghlia is a district in Boumerdès Province, Algeria. It was named after its capital, Baghlia.

Municipalities
The district is further divided into 3 municipalities:
Baghlia
Sidi Daoud
Taourga

History

French conquest

 Shipwreck of Dellys (15 May 1830), commanded by Captain Armand Joseph Bruat (1796-1855) and Captain Félix-Ariel d'Assigny (1794-1846).
 Expedition of the Col des Beni Aïcha (1837)
 First Battle of the Issers (27 May 1837), commanded by General Alexandre Charles Perrégaux (1791-1837) and Colonel Maximilien Joseph Schauenburg (1784-1838).
 First Assault of Dellys (28 May 1837), commanded by Captain Félix-Ariel d'Assigny (1794-1846).
 Second Assault of Dellys (12 May 1844), commanded by General Thomas Robert Bugeaud (1784–1849).
 Battle of the Col des Beni Aïcha (1871)

Algerian Revolution

Salafist terrorism

 August 2010 Baghlia bombing (18 August 2010)
 2012 Baghlia bombing (29 April 2012)

Zawiya

 Zawiyet Sidi Amar Cherif

Notable people

 Lounés Bendahmane, Algerian footballer.
 Rezki Zerarti, Algerian artist.
 Hocine Ziani, Algerian artist.
 , Algerian theologian.
 , Algerian footballer.

References

Districts of Boumerdès Province